Bradley County is the name of two counties in the United States:

 Bradley County, Arkansas 
 Bradley County, Tennessee